The 14th century lasted from 1 January 1301 (MCCCI) to 31 December 1400 (MCD). It is estimated that the century witnessed the death of more than 45 million lives from political and natural disasters in both Europe and the Mongol Empire. West Africa experienced economic growth and prosperity.

In Europe, the Black Death claimed 25 million lives  wiping out one third of the European population  while the Kingdom of England and the Kingdom of France fought in the protracted Hundred Years' War after the death of Charles IV, King of France led to a claim to the French throne by Edward III, King of England. This period is considered the height of chivalry and marks the beginning of strong separate identities for both England and France as well as the foundation of the Italian Renaissance and Ottoman Empire.

In Asia, Tamerlane (Timur), established the Timurid Empire, history's third largest empire to have been ever established by a single conqueror. Scholars estimate that Timur's military campaigns caused the deaths of 17 million people, amounting to about 5% of the world population at the time. Synchronously, the Timurid Renaissance emerged. In the Arab world, historian and political scientist Ibn Khaldun and explorer Ibn Battuta made significant contributions.
In India, the Bengal Sultanate got divided from the Delhi Sultanate, a major trading nation in the world. The sultanate was described by the Europeans as the richest country to trade with. The Mongol court was driven out of China and retreated to Mongolia, the Ilkhanate collapsed, the Chaghatayid dissolved and broke into two parts, and the Golden Horde lost its position as a great power in Eastern Europe.

In Africa, the wealthy Mali Empire, a huge producer of gold, reached its territorial and economic height under the reign of Mansa Musa I of Mali, the wealthiest individual of medieval times, and perhaps the wealthiest ever.

In the Americas, the Mexica founded the city of Tenochtitlan, while the Mississippian mound city of Cahokia was abandoned.

Events

1301–1309

 1305–1314: The Trials of the Knights Templar. The Knights Templar arrested and tried. Jacques de Molay, the last grand master of the Templars, is executed in 1314.
 1309: King Jayanegara succeeds Kertarajasa Jayawardhana as ruler of Majapahit.
 1309–1377: The Avignon papacy transfers the seat of the Popes from Italy to France.

1310s
 The Great Famine of 1315–1317 kills millions of people in Europe.
 1318–1330: An Italian Franciscan friar, Mattiussi, visited Sumatra, Java, and Banjarmasin in Borneo. In his record he described the kingdom of Majapahit.

1320s

 1320: Władysław I the Elbow-high is crowned King of Poland which leads to its later unification.
 1323: Malietoafaiga ordered cannibalism to be abolished in Tutuila (present-day American Samoa).
 1325: Forced out of previous habitations, the Mexica found the city of Tenochtitlan.
 1327: Tver Uprising against the Golden Horde.
 1328: Tribhuwana Wijayatunggadewi succeeds Jayanegara as ruler of Majapahit.
 1328–1333: Wang Dayuan, a traveller from Quanzhou, China during the Yuan dynasty, visited Luzon & Mindanao in the Philippines, many places in Southeast Asia, Sri Lanka and India, and reached Dhofar and Aden.

1330s

 1335: The death of the Ilkhan Abu Said causes the disintegration of the Mongol rule in Persia.
 1336: The Vijayanagara Empire is founded in South India by Harihara I.
 1337: The Hundred Years' War begins when Edward III of England lays claim to the French throne.

1340s

 1345–1346: The French recruit troops and ships in Genoa, Monaco, and Nice.
 1346: English forces led by Edward III defeat a French army led by Philip VI of France in The Battle of Crécy, a major point in the Hundred Years' War which marks the rise of the longbow as a dominant weapon in Western Europe.
 1347–1351: The Black Death kills around a third of the population of Europe.
 1347: Adityawarman moved the capital of Dharmasraya and established the kingdom of Malayupura in Pagarruyung, West Sumatra.
 1348: The 6.9-magnitude 1348 Friuli earthquake centered in Northern Italy was felt across Europe. Contemporaries linked the quake with the Black Death and Great Famine, fueling fears that the Biblical Apocalypse had arrived.

1350s
 1350: Ramathibodi I establishes the Ayutthaya Kingdom.
 1350: Hayam Wuruk, styled Sri Rajasanagara, succeeds Tribhuwana Wijayatunggadewi as ruler of Majapahit; his reign is considered the empire's 'Golden Age'. Under its military commander Gajah Mada, Majapahit stretches over much of modern-day Indonesia.
 1353: Fa Ngum established the Lan Xang kingdom in Laos.
 1356: The Imperial Diet of the Holy Roman Empire headed by Emperor Charles IV issues the Golden Bull of 1356, establishing various constitutional aspects of the Empire, the most significant being the electoral college to elect future emperors.
 1356: The Diet of the Hansa is held in Lübeck, formalising what up until then had only been a loose alliance of trading cities in northern Europe and officially founding the Hanseatic League.
 1357: Scotland retains its independence with the signing of the Treaty of Berwick, thus ending the Wars of Scottish Independence.
 1357: In the Battle of Bubat, the Sundanese royal family is massacred by the Majapahit army by the order of Gajah Mada; the death toll includes Sundanese king Lingga Buana and princess Dyah Pitaloka Citraresmi, who committed suicide.

1360s 

 1363: The Battle of Lake Poyang, a naval conflict between Chinese rebel groups led by Chen Youliang and Zhu Yuanzhang, takes place from August to October, constituting one of the largest naval battles in history.
 1365: The Old Javanese text Nagarakertagama is written.
 1366: Tepanec Tlatoani Acolnahuácatl accepts Acamapichtli as the first tlatoani of Tenochtitlan for the Mexica Empire.
 1368: The end of the Mongol Yuan Dynasty in China and the beginning of the Ming Dynasty.

1370s
 1371: The Battle of Maritsa, the Serbs are defeated by the Ottomans, with most of Serb nobility being killed.
 1377: Majapahit sends a punitive expedition against Palembang in Sumatra. Palembang's prince, Parameswara (later Iskandar Syah) flees, eventually finding his way to Malacca and establishing it as a major international port.
 1378: The Great Schism of the West splits the Catholic Church, eventually leading to three simultaneous popes and not resolved until 1417.
1378: Battle of the Vozha River between Russians and Mongols.
 1378–1382: Ciompi Revolt occurs in Florence.

1380s

1380: Russian principalities defeat the Golden Horde at the Battle of Kulikovo.
 1381: John Wycliffe is dismissed from the University of Oxford for criticism of the Catholic Church, leading to the Lollardy movement in England.
 1381: Peasants' Revolt in England.
1382: Khan Tokhtamysh captures Moscow.
1382: Barquq rise to power to start the Burji dynasty, the Circassian Mamuluk Dynasty in Egypt.
 1385: Battle of Aljubarrota between Portugal and Castile. Portugal maintains independence.
 1385: Union of Krewo between Poland and Lithuania.
 1389: Battle of Kosovo between Serbs and Ottoman Turks; Prince Lazar, Sultan Murad I and Miloš Obilić are killed.
 1389: Wikramawardhana succeeds Sri Rajasanagara as ruler of Majapahit.

1390–1400

 1391: Anti-Jewish pogroms spread throughout Spain and Portugal, and many thousands of Jews are massacred.
 1392: Taejo of Joseon establishes the Joseon Dynasty.
 1396: The Battle of Nicopolis, in which the Ottoman Empire defeats a large Crusader army of knights and infantry from various Christian kingdoms including Hungary, France, the Holy Roman Empire, Burgundy and Wallachia.
 1396: The Second Bulgarian Empire ends, with the capture of the last stronghold fortress of Vidin and its king Ivan Sratsimir by the Ottomans.
 1397: The Kalmar Union is established, uniting Norway, Sweden and Denmark into one kingdom.
 1397: Reign of Chimalpopoca begins as the third tlatoani of Tenochtitlan.

Undated 

Transition from the Medieval Warm Period to the Little Ice Age.
Crisis of the Late Middle Ages
 The poet Petrarch coins the term Dark Ages to describe the preceding 900 years in Europe, beginning with the fall of the Western Roman Empire in 476 through to the renewal embodied in the Renaissance.
 Beginning of the Ottoman Empire, early expansion into the Balkans.
 Iwan vault, Jamé Mosque of Isfahan, Isfahan, Iran, is built.
 Early 14th century: Kao Ninga paints Monk Sewing (attributed) in the Kamakura period (Cleveland Museum collection).
 An account of Buddha's life, translated earlier into Greek by Saint John of Damascus and widely circulated to Christians as the story of Barlaam and Josaphat, became so popular that the two were venerated as saints.
 Singapore emerges for the first time as an important fortified city and trading centre.
 Islam reaches Terengganu, on the Malay Peninsula as evidence by the Terengganu Inscription Stone.
 The Hausa found several city-states in the south of modern Niger.
 Work begins on the Great Enclosure at Great Zimbabwe, built of non-cemented, dressed stone. Research suggests the city's population to be between less than 10,000 to 18,000 at its peak.

Inventions, discoveries, introductions

 Music of Ars nova
 Foundation of the University of Kraków
 Chinese text the Huolongjing by Jiao Yu describes fire lances, fire arrows (rockets), rocket launchers, land mines, naval mines, bombards, cannons, and hollow cast iron cannonballs filled with gunpowder, and their use to set ablaze enemy camps
 First pound lock in Europe reportedly built in Vreeswijk, Netherlands in 1373

References

 
2nd millennium
Centuries